Kurt Sorge is a freeride mountain biker from Nelson, British Columbia, Canada, born on 28 November 1988.

Career
His major results include first place in the 2012, 2015, and 2017 Red Bull Rampage in Virgin, Utah, and placed second in 2008 and most recently 2021 Red Bull Rampage. He also placed 3rd in the 2011 Chatel Mountain style.

References

1988 births
Living people
Canadian male cyclists
Freeride mountain bikers
Canadian mountain bikers